See or SEE may refer to:
 Sight - seeing

Arts, entertainment, and media
 Music:
 See (album), studio album by rock band The Rascals
 "See", song by The Rascals, on the album See
 "See" (Tycho song), song by Tycho
 Television
 "See" (Preacher), episode of television series Preacher
 See (TV series), series on Apple TV+
 See Magazine, alternative weekly newspaper in Edmonton, 1992 to 2011

Education
 School of Experiential Education, Toronto alternative school
 Stanford Engineering Everywhere, Stanford University online-course series
 Student Excellence Expo
 Secondary Education Examination (Nepal)

Manual language schemata 
 Seeing Essential English (SEE1)
 Signing Exact English (SEE2)

Organisations 
 Society for Environment and Education
 Special Enrollment Examination, U.S. Internal Revenue Service series 
 Standard error of the equation, statistical method

Religion 
 Episcopal see, domain of a bishop
 Holy See, central government of Roman Catholic Church

Places 
 SEE, Southeast Europe, the geographical region
 Sées, Orne, France
 Southease railway station, a railway station in Sussex, England

Place names evoking the German noun "See" (pron. "zay") 
 See, Tyrol, Austria
 See District, Fribourg, Switzerland
 See District, St. Gallen, former district in Switzerland

Prominent lakes 
 Bodensee 
 Vierwaldstättersee (i.e. Lake Lucerne)

People 
  Members of See's Candies business family

Surname-last convention 
 John See (1844–1907), Premier of New South Wales from 1901 to 1904
 Thomas Jefferson Jackson See (1866–1962), American astronomer
 Elliot See (1927–1966), American aviator and NASA astronaut 
 Carolyn See (1934–2016), American author
 Clyde See (1941–2017), American lawyer and politician
 Lisa See (born 1955), American writer and novelist

Surname-first convention 
 See Kee Oon (born 1966), Judge of the Supreme Court of Singapore
 See Kok Luen (born 1988), Malaysian footballer

Other uses 
 Sealed Air, American manufacturing company (NYSE stock ticker)
 SEE, Gillespie Field, public airport near San Diego, California (IATA; FAA LID)
 See, scholars' citation signal
 See Tickets, British company
 Square Enix Europe, a British video game publisher 
 Other acronyms:
 Small Emplacement Excavator, military vehicle
 Significant Emotional Event, concept of sociologist Morris Massey
 Sensory Ethical Extrovert, in socionics

See also
 C (disambiguation)
 Seeing (disambiguation)